Mickaël Adon (born October 3, 1987 in Paris), better known as Mickaël Vendetta, is a French Internet phenomenon and entrepreneur whose notoriety followed upon the buzz he created on the internet through his personal blog.

Background
Vendetta began courses in Business Management in Asnières-sur-Seine, which he stopped after 3 months. He said that he was not made for the school system because he found it "too left-wing". He then decided to take control of his life and joined a gym in Puteaux. Months of training got him better physique.

He lists as his personal objectives, to become an actor, to market a clothing line, and release a single of house music. He also considers becoming a politician like Arnold Schwarzenegger, and, along with Bernard Tapie, supports Nicolas Sarkozy.

Career
Vendetta worked briefly in real estate before leaving that business to develop his philosophy of "Bogossitude" ("good looking guy-ness") and promoting it on his blog and in media.  He created a buzz by publishing partly naked videos of him on his personal blog, showing his physique and establishing having a strong personality, by being purposefully arrogant and pretentious in order to gain public response. The blog attracted more than 5,000,000 visitors.

He appeared on the site Trendywebtv.com, a site which had previously produced Cindy Sander.

Vendetta appeared on various TV and radio shows and acted for several TV commercial spots for Pringles chips, produced 
a house music single, and won La Ferme Célébrités (Celebrity Farm) (2010).  He has produced a house music single named "The bogoss Life" on XIII Bis Records,
as well as making appearances in business schools and night clubs.

Television and radio
Among the shows in which Vendetta has appeared are La méthode Cauet (The Cauet Method) on TF1, Chez Morandini on Direct8, LCI, as well as on Swiss TV and on Virgin Radio. His appearance on La méthode Cauet made the audience of the show become quite heated in response.

Critique
While he was part of the cast, and eventual winner, of La Ferme Célébrités 2010, the media had earlier criticized him for being arrogant, conceited and contemptuous.  In 2008, David Abiker of France Info compared Vendetta to Paris Hilton, in that he was engaged in a similar race for notoriety. Ecrans called Vendetta "une marchandise dont le contenu n'est rien d'autre que son propre message publicitaire" (a commodity whose content is nothing other than his own publicity).

References

External links
 

1987 births
Living people
People from Le Creusot
French television personalities
French bloggers
La Ferme Célébrités participants
French male writers
Male bloggers